Forgotten Tales is a Canadian power metal band from Quebec City, Quebec, originally formed in 1999.

Biography
Forgotten Tales were formed 1999 as a cover band, playing power metal songs by their favorite European bands. As one of Canada's few melodic power metal bands, they performed live regularly, including an opening slot for Finnish group Nightwish in Montreal in November, 2000. At this point, the group began writing original material for an album.

The group went into Victor studios in Montreal in April 2001 to record their debut effort, The Promise. Forgotten Tales supported groups such as Edguy and Gamma Ray.

In 2003, the band entered Menzo studios in Quebec City to record the material that would become their second album, All the Sinners, released in August, 2004.

In 2005, original drummer Cédric Prévost left the band, replaced by Mike Bélanger. At the beginning of the following year, the band opened for Finnish power metal act Sonata Arctica. In February 2007, the band announced their new keyboardist William Simard replaced, Frédérick Desroches. In February 2009, Desroches rejoined.

Their third album, We Shall See the Light, was released in 2010. This album was received well, reviews claiming that despite being an independent release, listeners "would not be able to tell". The drumming of Mike Belanger was praised, along with the strong vocal work of Sonia Pineault.

Musical style

Forgotten Tales in relation to power metal, claim to be "pioneers of this style in Canada". They cite their style as "Forgotten Tales music offers, to the heavy metal enthusiasts as well as those fond of whatever is new, a musical performance with hints of classical, baroque and, at times, progressive influences." Their singer Sonia Pineault has deeper voice range than typical female vocalists within power metal bands like Elize Ryd of Amaranthe, or Tarja Turunen. Sonia avoids the use of opera style vocals in lyrical portions of their songs, resulting in a direct, powerful feel emphasizing the lyrics. In terms of instrumentation, guitarists Marco Lavoie and Martin Desharnais demonstrate a very neoclassical style to solos. Their keyboardist uses harpsichord, choir, and string effects to give a folk feel to songs, as their songs feature medieval themes.

Band members
Current members
 Sonia Pineault – vocals
 Martin Desharnais – guitars, backing vocals
 Patrick Vir – bass
 Mike Bélanger – drums
 Frédéric Desroches – keyboards  
 Marco Lavoie – guitars

Former members
 Cédric Prévost – drums, backing vocals
 William Simard – keyboards

Discography

Albums
 The Promise (2001)
 All the Sinners (2004)
 We Shall See the Light (2010)

References

External links
 Forgotten Tales MySpace
 Forgotten Tales Facebook

Musical groups established in 1999
Canadian power metal musical groups
Musical groups from Quebec City
1999 establishments in Quebec